Hypoxia-Activated Prodrugs (HAPs) are prodrugs that target regions of tumor hypoxia within tumor cells. HAPs may offer the potential, alone and in combination with conventional chemotherapy, of improving cancer therapy. It is believed that tumor hypoxia contributes significantly to treatment failure and relapse among cancer patients because cells in the hypoxic zones of solid tumors resist traditional chemotherapy for at least two reasons:  first, most antitumor agents cannot penetrate beyond 50-100 micrometers from capillaries, thereby never reaching those cells in the hypoxic regions. Secondly, the lower nutrient and oxygen supply to cells in the hypoxic zones of tumors cause them to divide more slowly than their well oxygenated counterparts, so hypoxic tumor cells exhibit greater resistance to chemotherapies and radiation which target rapidly dividing cells or require oxygen for efficacy.

Hypoxia also contributes to the invasive and metastatic phenotypes of aggressive cancers by promoting genetic instability and accelerating the accumulation of mutations that can ultimately give rise to drug resistance.

There are several companies developing HAPs: Novacea, Inc. (acquired by Transcept/Paratek pharmaceuticals), Proacta Inc. (now defunct) and Threshold Pharmaceuticals, Inc. These companies are involved in developing the following drug candidates: AQ4N (Novacea), PR-104 (Proacta) and TH-302 (evofosfamide) and TH-4000 (tarloxotinib) (Threshold Pharmaceuticals).

References

Oxygen